Charles James Ferguson-Davie (1872–1963) was an Anglican bishop, the first Bishop of Singapore, appointed 1910.

Born into a clerical family, Ferguson-Davie was educated at Marlborough College and Trinity Hall, Cambridge. Ordained in 1896, his first post was as a curate at St Paul, Preston.  He then became an USPG missionary.

Ferguson-Davie became the first Anglican Diocese of Singapore from 1909 to 1927.

Ferguson-Davie was also a Priest and Warden in Natal. When he died he was the Church’s most senior bishop, having been consecrated 63 years earlier.

Personal life 
In 1902, he married Charlotte Elizabeth Ferguson-Davie.

References 

1872 births
People educated at Marlborough College
Alumni of Trinity Hall, Cambridge
Anglican bishops of Singapore
Singaporean religious leaders
1963 deaths
Anglican bishops of West Malaysia